Jim Gottfridsson (born 2 September 1992) is a Swedish handball player for SG Flensburg-Handewitt and the Swedish national team.

He participated on the Sweden men's national handball team at the 2016 Summer Olympics in Rio de Janeiro, in the men's handball tournament.

Career
In 1996 and aged four, Gottfridsson joined home town club IFK Ystad. In 2011, he joined top division team Ystads IF. After two years, he signed for German team SG Flensburg-Handewitt. In his first season, he won the EHF Champions League with SG by defeating arch-rivals THW Kiel 30–28 in the final. 

In the following years, Gottfridsson won the DHB-Pokal (2015) and the German championship twice (2018, 2019). He was voted MVP of the 2020-21 season.

With his country Sweden, he has won the 2022 European Championship and finished as runner-up at the 2018 European Championship and the 2021 World Championship. He was named MVP in 2018 and 2022.

Gottfridsson was nominated as IHF World Player of the Year for 2021, finishing second in the vote behind Niklas Landin.

Honours

Club
EHF Champions League
: 2014
 Handball-Bundesliga
 : 2018, 2019
 : 2016, 2017, 2020, 2021
 : 2014, 2015
DHB-Pokal
: 2015
 : 2014, 2016, 2017
 DHB-Supercup:
 : 2019
 : 2015, 2018, 2020

International
EHF European Championship
 : 2022
 : 2018
 IHF World Championship
 : 2021

Individual awards
Most Valuable Player (MVP) in Handball-Bundesliga 2020/21
All-Star Centre back of the World Championship: 2021
Most Valuable Player (MVP) of the European Championship: 2018, 2022
Swedish handball player of the year: 2018, 2022
Handball-Planet – Best World Handball Player: 2022

References

External links

1992 births
Living people
Swedish male handball players
Olympic handball players of Sweden
Handball players at the 2016 Summer Olympics
Ystads IF players
SG Flensburg-Handewitt players
Handball-Bundesliga players
Expatriate handball players
Swedish expatriate sportspeople in Germany
People from Ystad
Handball players at the 2020 Summer Olympics